George Harrington may refer to:

George Christy  (1827–1868), American minstrel performer born George Harrington
George P. Harrington (1850–?), American politician from Wisconsin